The 1967 Limerick Senior Hurling Championship was the 73rd staging of the Limerick Senior Hurling Championship since its establishment by the Limerick County Board.

Patricksell were the defending champions.

On 15 October 1967, Kilmallock won the championship after a 4-07 to 2-07 defeat of South Liberties in a final replay. It was their second championship title overall and their first championship title since 1960.

Results

Final

References

Limerick Senior Hurling Championship
Limerick Senior Hurling Championship